Toledo station may refer to:
 Martin Luther King Jr. Plaza (Toledo), the main passenger rail station of Toledo, Ohio
 Toledo railway station, Spain
 Toledo (Naples Metro), Italy